Norbert Christian (1925–1976) was a German film and television actor.

Selected filmography
 Once Is Never (1955)
 Thomas Müntzer (1956)
 Goods for Catalonia (1959)
 Italienisches Capriccio (1961)
 Follow Me, Scoundrels (1964)
 Die schwarze Mühle (1975, vocal cords for Leon Niemczyk)

References

Bibliography
 Stephen Brockmann. A Critical History of German Film. Camden House, 2010.

External links

1925 births
1976 deaths
German male film actors
German male television actors
Male actors from Berlin